Paul Zeltwanger (born March 28, 1966) is an American accountant and politician serving as a member of the Ohio House of Representatives. from the 54th district. Zeltwanger succeeded Peter Beck, who was facing dozens of felony charges. He won the primary with 51% of the vote, and won the general election with 72% of the vote. Zeltwanger works as a real-estate developer. He is also a certified public accountant.

Career

Abortion rights 
In 2019, Zeltwanger co-sponsored legislation that would ban abortion in Ohio and criminalize what they called "abortion murder". Doctors who performed abortions in cases of ectopic pregnancy and other life-threatening conditions would be exempt from prosecution only if they "[took] all possible steps to preserve the life of the unborn child, while preserving the life of the woman. Such steps include, if applicable, attempting to reimplant an ectopic pregnancy into the woman's uterus". Reimplantation of an ectopic pregnancy is not a recognized or medically feasible procedure.

COVID-19 and impeachment 
In August 2020, during the coronavirus pandemic, he joined John Becker, Candice Keller, and Nino Vitale in sponsoring a move to impeach against Mike DeWine, Ohio's Republican governor. The move was widely and immediately panned on both sides of the aisle and by legal scholars and commentators. Ohio Republican Party Chair Jane Timken "issued a scathing condemnation of the trio of conservatives", calling the move “a baseless, feeble attempt at creating attention for themselves.” Ohio House Speaker, Republican Bob Cupp, called it an "imprudent attempt" to cause "a state constitutional crisis". Legal scholar Jonathan Entin said the proposal "means that we’ve distorted our understanding both of what impeachment is supposed to do and how people – especially, elected officials – are supposed to disagree with each other. Do we really want to say that the government can’t act in an emergency because the officials are afraid that if they do anything, they’ll be removed from office? Of course, if they don’t do anything, maybe the response is going to be ‘Well you should be impeached for not acting.' CNN's Chris Cillizza analyzed it as one of several examples of how Donald Trump had politicized public health matters to the point Republican lawmakers felt they needed to make extreme and pointless moves in order to satisfy the base. DeWine responded by recommending his foes visit a hospital and talk to nurses.

References

External links
Representative Paul Zeltwanger (official site)
Official campaign site

Republican Party members of the Ohio House of Representatives
American accountants
1966 births
Living people
21st-century American politicians
People from Mason, Ohio
Grace College alumni
Kelley School of Business alumni